Jennifer Wynne Reeves  (born 1963 in Royal Oak, Michigan – died June 22, 2014) was an American painter. She studied at the Vermont Studio School between 1984 and 1985.  Her work was the subject of solo shows at the Max Protech (2001), Gorney, Bravin, and Lee (2000 in the Project Room), LittleJohn and Ramis Barquet Galleries, among other venues. She was a 2012 recipient of a Guggenheim fellowship.  in 2008 the Worcester Art Museum held a solo exhibition of selections from the previous three years of her work.
her work is included in the collection of the Seattle Art Museum.

Reeves died from a brain tumor on June 22, 2014, at the age of 51.

References
Most recent exhibit 10/11/18 through 2/2019 at the Drawing Center, New York, New York.

External links
The artist's archive - 

1963 births
2014 deaths
20th-century American painters
People from Royal Oak, Michigan
21st-century American painters